HC Viking are an ice hockey team based in Tallinn, Estonia. They are members of the Meistriliiga (EML). They have won one Estonian Championship since their founding in 2014. HC Viking play their home games at Tondiraba Ice Hall.

History
HC Viking was founded in 2014 by Anatoli Sizov and Igor Saveljev as a successor of the two-time Estonian champions HK Viiking Sport. The club won their first Estonian Championship trophy in the 2017–18 EML season.

Season-by-season record
This is a list of seasons completed by HC Viking.

Note: GP = Games played, W = Wins, OTW = Overtime wins, OTL = Overtime losses, L = Losses, Pts = Points, GF = Goals for, GA = Goals against

Awards and trophies
Estonian Championship
 2017–18

References

External links
 

2014 establishments in Estonia
Ice hockey clubs established in 2014
Ice hockey teams in Estonia